Joshua Calderón (born September 11, 1996) is a Puerto Rican football player who currently is on trial with America de Cali, one of the most historic clubs in the Colombian 1st Division League Dimayor Betplay.

Calderón denied his first contract at the age of 16 by Deportivo Pereira from Colombia. Joshua decided to finish his last year of high school in Newark, NJ with Saint Benedict’s Prep where he played against U23 Maccabi Haifa from Israel and U23 Liverpool of England while starting as a striker and left back for the best high school prep soccer team of all USA to date under Jimmy Wandling. He also won a USSDA National Championship with PDA under Sam Nellins. Calderón also played in U-17 World Cup Qualifiers in Cuba with the Puerto Rican National Team under Justin Campos, scoring once and assisting twice.

Calderón went on to study finance at Iona College, while receiving scholarship to play Division 1 NCAA College Soccer under Fernando Barboto. Soon after receiving his undergraduate degree, Calderón would debut for the Men’s National Team of Puerto Rico under Amado Guevara. Joshua Calderón maintained a starting role for over two years while traveling to 20+ countries pursuing different opportunities to sign a professional contract. Calderón graduated in 2018 and played that summer for the NPSL third division National Champions: Elm City Express where he made club history in the Lamar US Open cup against Charleston Battery of the USL. In 2019, Calderón arrived to second division Colombian side, Boyaca Chico, to sign a professional contract. After a couple of days, Calderón was invited to Patriotas Boyaca, the 1st Division Colombian club that shares the stadium with Chico in Tunja, Colombia.

Calderón would spend the next 6+ months with Patriotas under Diego Corredor as an American, whilst representing the Puerto Rico Men’s National team in international competition. Calderón denied a contract with Club Llaneros FC in efforts to stay with the first team Patriotas side in the first division. Nearly a full year went by and Calderón would finally gain his Colombian citizenship, passport, and national ID. Calderón spent two months with Hartford Athletic USL on an understood agreement to use this time preparation for a bigger opportunity in League 1 England with Cambridge United. When Calderón finally went to England, COVID-19 had dampened the opportunity.

Along with a sacked manager and a shortcut trial,  Joshua would quickly sign in New Zealand but unfortunately could not play as COVID-19 would shut down the league as well. After a tough 2020 Calderón participated in the Simon Bolivar with CD Ferroavario for two months scoring against Oriente Petrolero and maintaining a shutout against Guabira, two first division teams of Bolivia. Calderón was then brought into camp in 2021 under Dave Sarachan for the World Cup Qualifiers Men’s Puerto Rico National team. Calderón currently is back in Colombia’s first division with America de Cali.

College football 
Joshua Calderón was top goal scorer as a center back his senior year of college beating top 25 Uconn as well as tying top 20 Old Dominion. Prior to a successful four years at Iona College, Joshua Calderón won a USSDA National Championship with PDA Academy U18 in 2014. He also played for leading National Championship high school, Saint Benedict's Prep where he played target striker and accumulated numerous goals and assists as a starter. Benedict's hosted an international tournament where they played Maccabi Haifa of Israel, Liverpool of England, and Fuddercol of Colombia.

Career statistics

International

References

1996 births
Living people
Puerto Rican footballers
Puerto Rico international footballers
American soccer players
American sportspeople of Puerto Rican descent
Association football defenders
Iona Gaels men's soccer players
Soccer players from Connecticut
Sportspeople from New Haven County, Connecticut
American expatriate sportspeople in Spain
American expatriate sportspeople in Gibraltar
Expatriate footballers in Spain
Expatriate footballers in Gibraltar
American expatriate soccer players
F.C. Boca Gibraltar players